Ceroma is a genus of ceromid camel spiders, first described by Ferdinand Karsch in 1885.

Species 
, the World Solifugae Catalog accepts the following sixteen species:

 Ceroma biseriata Lawrence, 1960 — Angola
 Ceroma hessei Roewer, 1933 — Tanzania
 Ceroma inerme Purcell, 1899 — South Africa (Walvis Bay)
 Ceroma johnstonii Pocock, 1897 — Malawi
 Ceroma katanganum Roewer, 1933 — Congo
 Ceroma langi Hewitt, 1935 — Botswana
 Ceroma leppanae Hewitt, 1914 — South Africa, Zimbabwe
 Ceroma macrognatha Lawrence, 1954 — Tanzania
 Ceroma ornatum Karsch, 1885 — Ethiopia, Kenya, Tanzania, Uganda
 Ceroma pictulum Pocock, 1902 — Namibia, South Africa
 Ceroma sclateri Purcell, 1899 — South Africa
 Ceroma similis Roewer, 1941 — Tanzania
 Ceroma swierstrae Lawrence, 1935 — South Africa
 Ceroma sylvestris Lawrence, 1938 — Zimbabwe
 Ceroma victoriae Benoit, 1965 — Uganda
 Ceroma zomba Roewer, 1933 — Malawi

References 

Arachnid genera
Solifugae